Mariya Zdravkova Kocheva (born February 26, 1974 in Silistra) is a retired backstroke swimmer from Bulgaria. She was the only female member of the Bulgarian National Swimming Team (four men and one woman) at the 1992 Summer Olympics in Barcelona, Spain, where she didn't qualify for the finals in the women's 100 m backstroke (37th place) and the women's 200 m backstroke (36th place).

References
 sports-reference

1974 births
Living people
Female backstroke swimmers
Bulgarian female swimmers
Olympic swimmers of Bulgaria
Swimmers at the 1992 Summer Olympics
People from Silistra
20th-century Bulgarian women
21st-century Bulgarian women